Robert McElhenney III (born April 14, 1977) is an American actor, producer, writer, and podcaster. He is best known for his role as Ronald "Mac" McDonald on the FX/FXX comedy series It's Always Sunny in Philadelphia (2005–present), a show he co-created with Charlie Day and Glenn Howerton and on which he continues to serve as an executive producer and writer. He is also known for playing Ian Grimm on the Apple TV+ comedy series Mythic Quest (2020–present), which he co-created with Day and Megan Ganz and executive produces. 

In September 2020, McElhenney became the co-owner of the Welsh association football club Wrexham A.F.C. with Ryan Reynolds; this was covered in the FX sports documentary series Welcome to Wrexham (2022–present), on which he is one of the executive producers.

Early life
Robert McElhenney III was born in Philadelphia, Pennsylvania on April 14, 1977. Both of McElhenney's parents were of Irish descent. He was raised Catholic. Through his father, he is a cousin of Olympic rower Marcus McElhenney. When he was eight years old, his parents divorced after his mother came out as a lesbian. He and his two younger brothers were primarily raised by their father, though their parents remained close after the divorce. His two brothers are gay, and he describes himself as having "always been part of the gay community". Through his father's subsequent marriage, he also has a half-sister and step-sister. 

McElhenney attended Saint Joseph's Preparatory School in Philadelphia. He later briefly attended Temple University and then temporarily lived on the Fordham University campus with friends, but chose not to enroll.

Career 

McElhenney had his first major acting role with a small part in the 1997 film The Devil's Own, though his role was cut out of the final edit. He followed this with small parts in the films A Civil Action, Wonder Boys, and Thirteen Conversations About One Thing. He later had more substantial parts in the films Latter Days and The Tollbooth, and a guest role in the Law & Order episode "Thrill". When he was 21, a screenplay written by McElhenney was optioned with Paul Schrader attached to direct, but the project fell through after a year of edits and rewrites.

Initially based in New York City after graduation, McElhenney moved to Los Angeles at the age of 25. When he was 27 years old, he was waiting tables between acting jobs and had met Glenn Howerton through his agent, as well as meeting Charlie Day while shooting a horror film in New York City. His idea for a sitcom starring himself, Howerton, and Day came from a suggestion originally made by one of his closest childhood friends. The pilot was filmed on a budget of $200 and pitched to various cable networks. After receiving offers from many of the networks, McElhenney chose to sign with FX as they allowed him more creative freedom, and the show was eventually titled It's Always Sunny in Philadelphia. McElhenney was contracted as its showrunner, while both Howerton and Day were listed as executive producers.

McElhenney has said that 50 weeks per year are taken up by acting, producing, and writing for It's Always Sunny, though he did find time to appear in the Lost episode "Not in Portland". This was a result of him meeting Lost co-creator Damon Lindelof, who is a fan of It's Always Sunny. He later reprised his Lost role in another episode. He is a fan of Game of Thrones and said that he was thrilled when the series' creators David Benioff and D.B. Weiss asked him if they could write an episode of It's Always Sunny. He and his co-producers accepted the offer, resulting in the episode "Flowers for Charlie" in 2013. In 2019, he had a cameo appearance as an extra in the Game of Thrones episode "Winterfell".

In July 2015, McElhenney was confirmed by Mojang as the director of the upcoming animated Minecraft movie, but he later left the project.

In 2017, McElhenney appeared in a guest role as a police officer in the acclaimed Fargo episode "The Law of Non-Contradiction". He received praise for his performance from critics, who saw many of his character's traits and plot points as references to It's Always Sunny.

In 2020, McElhenney co-created the Apple TV+ comedy series Mythic Quest alongside Charlie Day and Megan Ganz. He also stars as Ian Grimm on the show and serves as a writer and executive producer. The series has received critical acclaim, with the review aggregation website Rotten Tomatoes giving the series an 89% approval rating. 

Since November 2021, McElhenney, Day and Howerton have been releasing The Always Sunny Podcast, originally intending on re-watching the entire series and sharing behind-the-scenes information, before the focus of the podcast naturally shifted to emphasize the banter and dynamic between the three creators.

Business interests
On September 23, 2020, it was announced by the Wrexham Supporters Trust that a business partnership had been formed by McElhenney and Canadian actor Ryan Reynolds and that they were in talks to purchase the Welsh football team Wrexham AFC. On November 16, it was confirmed that the two had successfully taken over the club after receiving the backing of the Wrexham Supporters Trust.

On June 7, 2022, McElhenney announced the launch of a new entertainment-tech company named Adim, co-founded by himself, Chase Rosenblatt, Melissa Kaspers, Spencer Marell, and Richard Rosenblatt.

Personal life 

McElhenney hired actress Kaitlin Olson to play Dee Reynolds on It's Always Sunny in Philadelphia, and became romantically interested in her "around season 2" of the series. He has called her "the funniest woman in show business". They were married in California on September 27, 2008. They have two sons named Axel Lee McElhenney (born on September 1, 2010) and Leo Grey McElhenney (born April 5, 2012). Olson went into labor with their first son while at a Philadelphia Phillies game.

In 2009, McElhenney and Olson announced their purchase of Skinner's Bar at 226 Market Street in Philadelphia, which they renamed Mac's Tavern.

Body 
In preparation for the seventh season of It's Always Sunny in Philadelphia, McElhenney put on 60 lb (27 kg) of fat and let his beard grow out to give extra humor to his character and add a new comedic direction for the season. His co-star Charlie Day described the weight gain as "disgusting" and said that the rest of the cast were "a little on the fence about it for his own personal health and safety". McElhenney subsequently lost 23 lb (10 kg) in a month after the season was finished filming, and lost the rest of the weight later in the year in time to film the next season.

In preparation for the show's 13th season, he transformed his body again, though this time he became excessively fit and athletic. He later joked in an Instagram post that it was "a super realistic lifestyle and an appropriate body image to compare oneself to".

Influences 
McElhenney has named The Marx Brothers, Woody Allen, Carl Reiner, Norman Lear, George Carlin, Gary David Goldberg, Larry David, and David Sedaris as his comedic influences.

Filmography

Film

Television

Web

Music videos

References

External links 

 
 
 

1977 births
Living people
American people of Irish descent
American male film actors
American male television actors
American television directors
American soccer chairmen and investors
Businesspeople from Pennsylvania
Television producers from Pennsylvania
Catholics from Pennsylvania
Male actors from Philadelphia
American television writers
American male television writers
20th-century American male actors
21st-century American male actors
Showrunners
21st-century American businesspeople
American LGBT rights activists
Screenwriters from Pennsylvania
St. Joseph's Preparatory School alumni
Association football chairmen and investors
Wrexham A.F.C. non-playing staff